Loxopterygium is a genus of plants in the family Anacardiaceae.

Taxonomy

Species

, Plants of the World online has 4 accepted species: 

 Loxopterygium gardneri 
 Loxopterygium grisebachii, 
 Loxopterygium huasango 
 Loxopterygium sagotii

References

 
Anacardiaceae genera
Taxonomy articles created by Polbot